Italy is the home of two of the world's biggest publishers of books in terms of revenue: Messaggerie Italiane and Mondadori Libri. Other large publishers include De Agostini Editore, Feltrinelli and the RCS MediaGroup.

History

Early printing press on Italian soil were established by a German colony in Subiaco in 1464, when Arnold Pannartz and Konrad Sweynheim produced a Latin grammar by Donatus. Printing technology later developed in the 1460s in Rome and Venice, and in the 1470s in Bergamo, Bologna, Brescia, Cremona, Ferrara, Florence, Genoa, Lucca, Mantua, Messina, Milan, Modena, Naples, Padua, Palermo, Parma, Pavia, Perugia, Piacenza, Reggio Calabria, Treviso, Turin, Verona and Vicenza. By the 1480s printing facilities were also present in L'Aquila, Pisa, Reggio Emilia, Siena, and Udine.

The Biblioteca Nazionale Centrale di Roma was founded in 1876. As official legal deposit libraries, both maintain copies of all works published in Italy.

Notable publishers in Italy include Valentino Bompiani, Giovanni De Agostini, Giulio Einaudi, Giangiacomo Feltrinelli, Aldo Garzanti, Ulrico Hoepli, Leo Longanesi, Arnoldo Mondadori, Angelo Rizzoli and Albert Skira.  

The United Nations Educational, Scientific and Cultural Organization named Turin the 2006 World Book Capital.

Bookselling
Notable bookstores in Italy include:
 Casella Studio Bibliografico (est. 1825), Naples
 Feltrinelli (est. 1954), chain retailer
 Libreria antiquaria Bourlot (est. 1848), Turin
 Libreria Antiquaria Pregliasco (est. 1912), Turin
 Libreria Internazionale Luxemburg (est. 1872), Turin 
 Libreria Babele (est. 1987), Milan
 Libreria Bozzi (est. 1810), Genoa
 Libreria Internazionale Hoepli (est. 1879), Milan
 Mondadori Mediastore (est. 1907), Milan
 Rizzoli (est. 1927), Milan

Fairs
 Bologna Children's Book Fair 
 Turin International Book Fair

In popular culture
 The Name of the Rose (film), 1986

See also
 Category:Book publishing companies of Italy
 Collection (publishing)
 Publishing in Italy (in Italian)
 List of libraries in Italy
 Italian bibliophiles (fr)
 Italian literature
 Media of Italy
 Copyright law of Italy

Notes

References

This article incorporates information from the Italian Wikipedia.

Bibliography

in English
 
 
 
 
  
  (Includes info about Italy)
  + part 2, 1986

in Italian
  1886-
  1899-
  1923-

Images

External links

  (Bibliography of editions published on Italian peninsula)
 
 
  (Bibliography)

Italy
Mass media in Italy
 
Libraries in Italy